Bako is a town in north-western Ivory Coast. It is a sub-prefecture and commune of Odienné Department in Kabadougou Region, Denguélé District.

In the Dioula language of Ivory Coast and the Bambara language of Mali, "Bako" means "behind the river": "Ba" means "river" and "ko" means "behind". The people of the town are mostly agrarian.

In 2014, the population of the sub-prefecture of Bako was 17,253.

Villages
The 26 villages of the sub-prefecture of Bako and their population in 2014 are:

References

Sub-prefectures of Kabadougou
Communes of Kabadougou